Vern Thiessen (born c. 1964) is a Canadian playwright.

Born in Winnipeg, Manitoba, Thiessen studied at the University of Winnipeg and graduated with a Bachelor of Arts. He later attended the University of Alberta, where he obtained a Master of Fine Arts degree.

Thiessen previously lived in Edmonton, Alberta and was formerly a drama instructor at the University of Alberta. He is a past president of both the Playwrights Guild of Canada and the Writers' Guild of Alberta.

Thiessen is the recipient of numerous awards, including the Governor General's Award for English-language drama (Einstein's Gift), the Carol Bolt Award for Best Play (Vimy) and the Sterling Award for Outstanding New Play (Apple). He has also received the City of Edmonton Arts Achievement Award and the Alumni Award of Excellence from the University of Alberta. He has been nominated several times for other awards including the Siminovitch Prize in Theatre, and was a finalist for the Governor General's Award for Lenin's Embalmers.

Thiessen's work has been translated into several languages including German, French, Polish and Hebrew.  His plays are performed regularly in Canada, the United States, the UK and Europe. He has also been produced in Australia and Asia. Shakespeare's Will has been produced twice at Canada's Stratford Festival. Lenin's Embalmers, A More Perfect Union and Einstein's Gift have been produced Off-Broadway. 
 
Thiessen has served as playwright in residence at the Citadel Theatre and Workshop West Theatre in Edmonton. He is currently an associate artist at Epic Theatre Ensemble.  He is also project associate for the New Play Frontiers program at People's Light at Theatre in Malvern, PA.

Thiessen is currently at work on several commissions for the Ensemble Studio Theatre (New York), Touchstone Theatre/Patrick Street (Vancouver), Soulpepper Theatre Company (Toronto) and Epic Theatre Ensemble (New York.) His plays are published by Playwrights Canada Press.

From 2007 until 2014 he lived in New York City. He is married to novelist Susie Moloney.

Vern returned to Edmonton to serve as the Artistic Director of Work Shop West Theatre in 2014.

In 2014 he won the Dora Mavor Moore Award for Outstanding New Play for his theatrical adaptation of W. Somerset Maugham's novel Of Human Bondage.

Theatrical works
 1987: The Courier
 1990: The Resurrection of John Frum
 1996: Blowfish
 2002: Apple
 2003: Einstein's Gift
 2005: Shakespeare's Will
 2006: Back to Berlin
2007: Vimy
2007: Bird Brain
2007: Rich (with composer Olaf Pyttlik)
2009: A More Perfect Union
2010: Lenin's Embalmers
2011: The Last Tree of Rapa Nui (with composer Olaf Pyttlik)
2012: Do Not Disturb
2014: Of Human Bondage (adaptation)

References

External links
 Vern Thiessen

1960s births
Living people
20th-century Canadian dramatists and playwrights
Writers from Winnipeg
University of Alberta alumni
Academic staff of the University of Alberta
University of Winnipeg alumni
Governor General's Award-winning dramatists
21st-century Canadian dramatists and playwrights
Canadian male dramatists and playwrights
Dora Mavor Moore Award winners
20th-century Canadian male writers
21st-century Canadian male writers
Canadian Mennonites
Mennonite writers